Thirsk was a parliamentary borough in Yorkshire, represented in the English and later British House of Commons in 1295, and again from 1547. It was represented by two Members of Parliament until 1832, and by one member from 1832 to 1885, when the constituency was abolished and absorbed into the new Thirsk and Malton division of the North Riding of Yorkshire.

The borough consisted of originally of the town of Old Thirsk, and included a population of only 1,378 at the 1831 census. The right to vote was restricted to the holders of burgage tenements, of which there were 50 in 1831. The Frankland family were the local landowners (in 1816 Sir Thomas owned 49 of the 50 burgage tenements), and in effect could nominate whoever they wanted as Members of Parliament; there was no contested election in Thirsk between 1715 and 1832.

The Great Reform Act of 1832 expanded the boundaries to include the townships of Thirsk, Sowerby, Carlton Miniott, Sandhutton, Bagby and South Kilvington, increasing the population to 4,672 and encompassing 1,064 houses, which was considered big enough for the borough to retain one of its two members.

Members of Parliament

Constituency re-created (1547)

MPs 1547–1660

MPs 1640–1832

MPs 1832–1885

Election results

Elections in the 1830s

Frankland resigned, causing a by-election.

Elections in the 1840s

Elections in the 1850s
Bell's death caused a by-election.

Elections in the 1860s

Elections in the 1870s

Elections in the 1880s

Notes

References
D. Brunton & D. H. Pennington, Members of the Long Parliament (London: George Allen & Unwin, 1954)
"Cobbett's Parliamentary history of England, from the Norman Conquest in 1066 to the year 1803" (London: Thomas Hansard, 1808) 
F W S Craig, "British Parliamentary Election Results 1832-1885" (2nd edition, Aldershot: Parliamentary Research Services, 1989)
J Holladay Philbin, "Parliamentary Representation 1832 - England and Wales" (New Haven: Yale University Press, 1965)
Henry Stooks Smith, "The Parliaments of England from 1715 to 1847" (2nd edition, edited by FWS Craig - Chichester: Parliamentary Reference Publications, 1973)
 Frederic A Youngs, jr, "Guide to the Local Administrative Units of England, Vol II" (London: Royal Historical Society, 1991)

History of North Yorkshire
Parliamentary constituencies in Yorkshire and the Humber (historic)
Constituencies of the Parliament of the United Kingdom established in 1547
Constituencies of the Parliament of the United Kingdom disestablished in 1885
Thirsk